Magnus Johannes Heunicke (born 28 January 1975 in Næstved) is a Danish journalist and politician who serves as a member of the Folketing for the Social Democrats political party. He was the Minister of Health from 2019 to 2022, and minister of elderly affairs from 2019 to 2021.

Background
He was born in Næstved to former mayor Henning Jensen and school teacher Inger Heunicke, and is married to Nina Groes. 

Heunicke has an education as a journalist, graduating from Aarhus journalist high school in 2002 and later working for DR in the period 2001-2005. Heunicke left the field of journalism in 2005 to pursue a parliamentary career. Before starting his education as a journalist, Heunicke graduated from Næstved gymnasium in Næstved, in 1995.

Political career
Heunicke was first elected member of Folketinget for the Social Democrats in the 2005 Danish general election, and reelected in 2007 and 2011. In 2014 he was appointed Minister for Transport, after Pia Olsen Dyhr. He was reelected again in 2015 and 2019.

Minister of Health (2019-2022)
Heunicke was appointed Minister for Health and Elderly Affairs in the Frederiksen Cabinet from 27 June 2019.

Together with Frederiksen cabinet, he led the Danish government's response to the contain the spread of COVID-19 pandemic. In December 2020, COVID-19 vaccines reached the country and began to the administrated. From January 2021, he was only Minister of Health. In the summer of 2021, he also led the government’s response to a strike among more than 6,000 nurses over pay.

External links

References

1975 births
Living people
People from Næstved Municipality
Social Democrats (Denmark) politicians
Government ministers of Denmark
Danish Health Ministers
Members of the Folketing 2005–2007
Members of the Folketing 2007–2011
Members of the Folketing 2011–2015
Members of the Folketing 2015–2019
Members of the Folketing 2019–2022
Members of the Folketing 2022–2026
Transport ministers of Denmark